XHRCG-TDT, also known as RCG Televisión, is a television station located in Saltillo, Coahuila, Mexico. The station was previously a Televisa local station, with programming from FOROtv. It currently airs as its own local productions and news, and is owned by Grupo RCG.

History
XHRCG came to air as XHAD-TV, owned by Alberto Jaubert and receiving its concession in 1968. In the 1980s, after Jaubert's death, the station was sold to Roberto Casimiro González Treviño, and in 1991 it was rechristened XHRCG-TV.

The station has a repeater, XHCAW-TDT channel 36 (virtual channel 58) in Ciudad Acuña. XHCAW produces its own local news but is tightly integrated into XHRCG's programming.

Digital television
XHRCG and XHCAW applied for and built digital facilities in 2015. XHRCG was the last station to come to air in Saltillo; it went off air along with other stations there on December 11. XHCAW went off the air with stations in Acuña on the 22nd.

External links
RCG Homepage
RCG online feed

References

Independent television stations in Mexico
Television stations in Coahuila
Mass media in Saltillo
Television channels and stations established in 1968
1968 establishments in Mexico